Nikola Nikodijević (born 26 September, 1981) is a Serbian politician serving as the president of the City Assembly of Belgrade since 23 April, 2014. He is a member of the main board of the Socialist Party of Serbia (SPS).

Biography 
He was born on 26 September 1981 in Belgrade. He graduated from the Faculty of Law at the University of Belgrade.

In his youth, he was active in sports and was engaged in SD Crvena zvezda.

As a member of the Socialist Party of Serbia (SPS) he was elected to the City Assembly of Belgrade following the 2008 City Assembly election. Until 2012 he served as the head of the SPS-JS deputy group in the City Assembly.

He was named member of the City Council on 13 June 2012 and served until 2013, when he was appointed by the Government of Serbia as a member of the Temporary Council of Belgrade.

He was elected President of the City Assembly of Belgrade on 23 April 2014 and re-elected in 2018 and 2022.

References 

1981 births
Living people
Politicians from Belgrade
Socialist Party of Serbia politicians